O periergos is a 1982 Greek comedy film directed by Omiros Evstratides and starring Stathis Psaltis, Mimis Fotopoulos and Kaiti Finou.

Plot
The hotel where Simos (Stathis Psaltis) works confronted problems, in wihc someone sabotaged by actions.  Whoever wanted to encounter was Myrto (Kaiti Finou) and the daughter of the same, it holds the secret identity that worked in the reception.  From the first moment arrived in clash with Simos.

Cast
Stathis Psaltis as Simos Aftias
Mimis Fotopoulos as hotel manager
Kaiti Finou as Myrto or Mirto
Athinodoros Prousalis as Megalos
Thanassis Papadopoulos as Nektarios
Vina Assiki
Sofia Hristou
Vassilis Tsaglos as Stratigos

Other information
Year: 1982
Genre: Comedy
Length: 90 minutes

1982 films
1980s Greek-language films
1982 comedy films
Greek comedy films